is a railway station in Adachi, Tokyo Prefecture, Japan. Its station number is TX07. The station opened on 24 August 2005.

Line

Rokuchō Station is served by the following line:

Metropolitan Intercity Railway Company
Tsukuba Express

Station layout

The station consists of a single underground island platform.

Platforms

External links
 TX Rokucho Station 

Railway stations in Japan opened in 2005
Railway stations in Tokyo
Stations of Tsukuba Express